Villainy may refer to:
 the activities or character of a villain
 Villainy (band), an alternative rock band from New Zealand
 Villainy Inc., fictional characters who battle Wonder Woman
 "Villainy", a song by Local Natives from the 2016 album Sunlit Youth

See also

Villain (disambiguation)
Villainy & Virtue, a 2004 album by Dead to Fall